Air transport of the British royal family and government is provided, depending on the circumstances and availability, by a variety of military and civilian operators. This includes an Airbus Voyager of the Royal Air Force, No. 10 Squadron and the King's Helicopter Flight, which forms part of the royal household. Civil aircraft and scheduled commercial flights are also utilised.

History

Royal Family 
The first aircraft ordered specifically for transport of the royal family, two Westland Wapitis, were delivered to No. 24 Squadron at RAF Northolt in April 1928. Although the RAF maintained at least one of these aircraft for a time the Prince of Wales eventually became solely responsible for the aircraft. When the Prince ascended to the throne in 1936 as Edward VIII, The King's Flight was formed as the world's first head of state aircraft unit. In contrast the first flight of a sitting U.S. president was in January 1943. This unit initially used the King's own de Havilland DH.89 Dragon Rapide. The flight was commanded by the prince's personal pilot, Edward "Mouse" Fielden who continued to lead the flight before and after the war.

In May 1937 an AS.6J Envoy III replaced the Rapide. The King's Flight Envoy had seats for four passengers plus a pilot, wireless operator and steward. When Nevil Shute Norway of Airspeed queried the need for a steward on flights of up to two or three hours, he was told by the captain of the flight, Wing Commander Fielden "of the fatigue that royal personages must endure ... of radiant people who had opened a Town Hall and shaken a thousand hands ... collapsing in a coma of fatigue directly the door was shut, grey faced and utterly exhausted".

The outbreak of World War II in 1939 led to the replacement of the Envoy III with an armed Lockheed Hudson. A de Havilland Flamingo was added to The King's Flight in September 1940.

In 1942, The King's Flight was disbanded and its responsibilities transferred to No. 161 Squadron. No. 161 Squadron was an operational military squadron, involved in the dropping of supplies and agents over occupied Europe throughout the War. The King's Flight was reformed on 1 May 1946 at RAF Benson with a single aircraft, a de Havilland Dominie and, soon after, with four Vickers Viking C.2.

As The Queen's Flight from 1952, the unit operated a variety of aircraft for the transportation and pilot training of members of the royal family, including Vickers Viking, Avro York, de Havilland Heron and Devon, Westland Whirlwind, Westland Wessex HCC.4, Douglas Dakota (for the Royal Visit to Nepal in 1960), de Havilland Canada DHC-1 Chipmunk, Beagle Basset and Hawker Siddeley Andover aircraft.

On 2 November 1977, Queen Elizabeth II travelled for the first time aboard Concorde (aircraft G-BOAE). Her Majesty then flew from the Grantley Adams International Airport, Barbados, to London Heathrow, England. That occasion was also the first visit by a Concorde aircraft to Barbados.

In 1983, the RAF leased two BAe 146 aircraft to assess their suitability as replacements for The Queen's Flight's Andovers. The trial was a success and three VIP-configured BAe 146-100s entered service with The Queen's Flight (as BAe 146 CC.2s) from 1986 as the flight's first jet aircraft. In 2002 one of these BAe 146s was sold as surplus. These jets, also known as the BAe 146 Statesman, have a specially designed Royal Suite cabin. Although the civilian BAe 146-100 has 70-94 seats, the two BAe 146 CC.2 are configured for 19 or 26 passengers in comfort.

The Royal Squadron 

On 1 April 1995, The Queen's Flight was merged into No. 32 Squadron RAF to become No. 32 (The Royal) Squadron. Its BAe 146s and two Westland Wessex HCC.4 helicopters moved from Benson to 32 Squadron's base at RAF Northolt.

The responsibility for royal family travel was transferred to the royal household on 1 April 1997. Before then, it was shared by the Ministry of Defence, the Department of Transport and the Foreign and Commonwealth Office. The funding comes in the form of a royal travel grant-in-aid provided by the Department for Transport. Later in 1997, the Royal Yacht Britannia was retired and not replaced, and the Royal Household was given authorisation to acquire a helicopter for its private use.

The Royal Helicopter and the Royal Train are insufficient to meet all the travel requirements of the royal family, even for domestic travel. The King does not travel on scheduled flights, but the rest of the family does whenever possible. Members of the family are normally flown on private charters, either large fixed-wing aircraft, small fixed-wing aircraft, or helicopters, depending on the distance and the size of the official party.

The squadron merger ended the RAF's provision of dedicated VIP transport aircraft; the aircraft of 32 Squadron are only available to VIP passengers if not needed for military operations. This was declared officially in 1999, with the Ministry of Defence stating "the principal purpose of 32 Squadron [is] to provide communications and logistical support to military operations; the Squadron's capacity should be based on military needs only; and any royal or other non-military use of... spare capacity is secondary to its military purpose." The effect of this declaration was to radically reduce the charge per hour to the royal travel grant-in-aid for flying in an RAF jet, because now only the variable costs of the flight were expensed to the royal travel budget.

BAe 146 
Operated for The Queen's Flight since 1986 two of these aircraft remained available to No. 32 Squadron as short-haul VIP configured airliners.

It was also announced in the Strategic Defence and Security Review 2015 that the current Command Support Air Transport fleet aircraft would be replaced as they reached the end of their life to increase their operational utility and ensure continued effective transport for the Royal Family and senior ministers.

In February 2022 Defence Equipment and Support announced that the four BAe 146 aircraft will be replaced by two Dassault Falcon 900LX aircraft.

Other aircraft 
Other RAF aircraft have transported members of the Royal family and ministers, particularly for long range trips for which The King's Flight and Royal Squadron planes were unsuitable. This most often involved Vickers VC10 C.1s, XR807 and XV106, of the now disbanded No. 10 Squadron - later subsumed by No. 101 Squadron based at RAF Brize Norton.

Occasionally, the supersonic passenger aircraft, Concorde, was used to transport the Prime Minister and Royal Family, particularly to international conferences abroad.  The first supersonic flight that Queen Elizabeth II experienced was on 2 November 1977 at the end of her Silver Jubilee.

Current aircraft
Most air travel by cabinet and junior ministers is on scheduled commercial flights. Travel on 32 Squadron aircraft is recommended where it is more cost-effective than using commercial air transport, or where security considerations dictate that special flights should be used. In 2016, the VIP RAF Voyager became the first dedicated VIP transport plane for government ministers and the Royal Family, after such plans had been proposed and shelved repeatedly since the 1990s. 

The majority of non-scheduled travel for the Royal Family is provided by private charter, with Luxaviation UK being the exclusive supplier of private charters to the Royal Family since April 2009.

Principal VIP aircraft

Airbus Voyager 

Historically, only the Royal Family had dedicated aircraft; government ministers would fly on commercial flights, rented private jets, or occasionally RAF-operated flights. Proposals to provide a new dedicated VIP transport aircraft, for governmental or royal use, were first mooted in 1998. However, in March 2009 a proposal for a £7 million 12-seater private jet plans were halted by recession. In November 2015, it was announced the government would fit VIP seating to one of the nine core fleet of RAF Airbus Voyager tanker/transport aircraft for the use of senior government officials and members of the Royal Family. The Voyager refit cost £10 million and the government estimated the use of the aircraft would save £775,000 a year versus the cost of charter flights; The new arrangement was expected to cost around £2,000 per flying hour as opposed to £6,700 for long-haul charter. The refit included a secure satellite communications system, missile detection, conference facilities, a changing room, 58 business class seats and 100 economy seats.

The aircraft, the VIP RAF Voyager, retained the standard Royal Air Force livery and continued its primary military duties when not in use by the government. Its first use as a VIP transport was on 8 July 2016, when it was used to take government ministers from London Heathrow airport to the 2016 NATO conference in Warsaw, Poland.

In 2018, the then foreign secretary,  Boris Johnson, criticised the arrangements, protesting that the Voyager "never seems to be available". He also remarked that the aircraft's "drab grey colours undermined Britain's reputation when the country needed a powerful 'flagship'" and suggested that provision of a dedicated government aircraft would be desirable '"if there's a way of doing it that is not exorbitantly expensive". In June 2020 the aircraft was repainted in colours of the Union Jack at a cost of £900,000.

Others

AgustaWestland AW109SP 
A Royal Air Force AgustaWestland AW109SP helicopter is occasionally used by ministers. Based at RAF Northolt, the helicopter performs the Command Support Air Transport role for senior military commanders and government ministers. Depending on requirements, other RAF helicopters may be used.

Dassault 900LX 

In February 2022 Defence Equipment and Support announced that No. 32 Squadron (previously the Queen's Flight) will acquire two Dassault 900LX aircraft.
The first of these jets was delivered to RAF Northolt in May 2022. The RAF named the new aircraft type Envoy IV.

Both planes were used to take Prime Minister Boris Johnson and Liz Truss to Aberdeen Airport on 6 September 2022 as part of their journey to meet The Queen at Balmoral Castle to resign from and take the office of Prime Minister, respectively.

Airbus A321-2NX(LR) 

In November 2020, the Cabinet Office signed a contract with Corporate Travel Management (North) Ltd for the exclusive lease of a VIP configured aircraft for the use of the prime minister, other ministers and VIPs. The contract was initially for two years (extendable to five years) with a potential total value of £75 million. The Cabinet Office had called for an aircraft with at least 30 and preferably 50 fully "lie-flat" seats, meeting areas, high-speed internet and secure weapons storage. The aircraft was required be available within 12 hours notice, be capable of carrying 30–50 passengers with 55 kg of luggage each, at least from London to Washington (4,500 nm) in all weathers and be available 24/7 while flying 50 hours per month. A "key" aspect was that the aircraft be painted in the same Global Britain livery as the VIP Voyager. The travel management company sub-contracted Titan Airways to provide the actual service and an Airbus A321-200 NEO registered G-XATW entered service in early 2021.  In April 2022, the aircraft was repainted and leased from Titan to luxury travel operator TCS World Travel, and the government was provided by Titan Airways with an identical A321Neo, registered G-GBNI, which operates on the same basis.

Royal Family

The King's Helicopter Flight 

The King’s Helicopter Flight (TKHF) is part of the King's Private Secretary's department of the Royal Household, and is tasked by the Royal Travel Office at Buckingham Palace. Known as The Queen's Helicopter Flight (TQHF) until the death of Queen Elizabeth II, it is currently based at RAF Odiham and operates two Sikorsky S-76C++ helicopters, with the registrations G-XXEB and G-XXED.

From 1998 to 2009, it used a single maroon Sikorsky S-76C+ twin-engined helicopter, registered  G-XXEA in honour of G-AEXX, the Airspeed Envoy that the Queen's uncle, the Prince of Wales, first flew in the King's Flight. The helicopter, the first airframe dedicated solely to royal use, entered service on 21 December 1998. The S-76 is a commercial type widely used around the world, although the Kings's helicopter is fitted with only six seats for more comfort.

On 4 November 2009, Sikorsky announced the delivery of a new S-76C++ helicopter to TQHF. An AgustaWestland AW109S, registration G-XXEC, was operated on long-term lease to TQHF from 2014 to 2019. TQHF took ownership of a second Sikorsky S-76C, G-XXED, in 2019.

Airspace restrictions released on 9 September 2022, prior to the funeral of Queen Elizabeth II, indicated that TQHF had been renamed as TKHF.

Fleet overview

Current fleet

Historical fleet

Cost of royal travel

The cost of royal travel (not including cars) is dominated by royal air travel, but also includes trains and yacht charter. All costs for the previous financial year ending 31 March are documented every year in an Appendix to the Sovereign Grant Report detailing the expenses. The report does not show individual flights but overall trip budgets, which may include pre-trip reconnaissance and other associated costs. Only trips in excess of £15,000 are detailed with trips under that amount being presented as a block total.  In 2020 total travel costs of £2,825,633 for the year 2019-2020 were reported.

The 1999 declaration that the principal purpose of 32 Squadron was to provide communications and logistical support to military operations reduced the charge per hour to the royal travel grant-in-aid for flying in an RAF jet, because now only the variable costs of the flight were expensed to the royal travel budget.

However, on 1 April 2010, the hourly rate for journeys by the Queen and the Prince of Wales was increased dramatically from £1,138 for a BAe 125 and £1,846 for a BAe 146, to £9,997 and £13,086 respectively. No journeys were undertaken under these arrangements. On 1 December 2010, the rates were reduced (BAe 125: £4,000 and BAe 146: £5,000 per flying hour).

Under these higher prices, the royal family flew only twice on military jets in financial year 2010–2011. The Prince of Wales and Duchess of Cornwall flew the BAe 146 to Madrid and Lisbon in March 2011 (4 flight hours), and one non-itemised flight was taken on a BAe 125 (1 flight hour).

Criticism of royal air travel
Some criticism was aimed at expensive charters that were employed for visits of King Charles III, during his time as Prince of Wales for trips that some believe were not critical to his role as British heir apparent. Two of the most expensive charters were for visits to South America in March 2009 (£660,594) for a tour related to the Prince's ecological concerns, and a trip to Japan and Indonesia in October and November 2008 that cost £665,674.

Between 12 and 16 June 2010, the then-Prince of Wales and the Duchess of Cornwall took a four-day short break to their home in Balmoral, Scotland. The charge to the government was £29,786 for a jet to fly them to Aberdeen and to return to London.

Prince Charles's choice of chartering an Airbus A319 that seats 29 people for a tour in 2009 to raise environmental awareness was criticised for its carbon footprint.

See also 
 State and royal cars of the United Kingdom
 List of royal yachts of the United Kingdom
 Royal barge of the United Kingdom
 British Royal Train
 Air transports of heads of state and government

References

External links 
 BAe 146 CC2 at the Royal Air Force
 BAe HS.125 CC3 at the Royal Air Force

UK
British monarchy
Royal vehicles
British royal family
Government of the United Kingdom
Vehicles of the United Kingdom